Morro d'Oro Calcio is an Italian association football club based in Morro d'Oro, Abruzzo. They currently play in Prima Categoria. Their official colors are white and red.

References

External links
SoccerWay club page

Football clubs in Abruzzo
Association football clubs established in 1976
Serie C clubs
1976 establishments in Italy